M Khurshid Hossain is a Bangladeshi police officer and Director General of Rapid Action Battalion. He is the former Additional Inspector General (Crime and Operations) of the Police Headquarters. Prior to that, he was DIG of Police Headquarters.

Early life 
Hossain was born on 5 June 1964 in Kashiani Upazila, Gopalganj District.

Career 
Hossain joined the 12th BCS Police Cadre as Assistant Superintendent of Police. Hossain was the Additional Superintendent of Police in Pabna District in 2001. During the 2001 to 2006, Bangladesh Nationalist Party government Hossain was denied promotions and better positions along with other officers from Gopalganj District, Faridpur District, and religious minorities. He served as the Superintendent of Police of Chuadanga District and Pabna District.

Hossain served as Superintendent of Police of Madaripur District.

In his job life he served as Deputy Inspector General of Police in Rajshahi Range. Then, Deputy Inspector General of Police (Operation) at police headquarters. He was promoted to the post of Additional Inspector General of Police on May, 2021.

Hossain was appointed Director General of Rapid Action Battalion in September 2022.

References 

Living people
1964 births
People from Gopalganj District, Bangladesh
Bangladeshi police officers
Rapid Action Battalion officers